Geoff Charles Ogilvy (born 11 June 1977) is an Australian professional golfer. He won the 2006 U.S. Open and has also won three World Golf Championships.

Professional career

Ogilvy was born in Adelaide, South Australia to an English-born father Mike and Australian born mother Judy. He turned professional in May 1998 and he won a European Tour card at that year's Qualifying school. He played on the European Tour in 1999 and 2000, finishing 65th in his first season and improving to 48th in his second. He joined the U.S. based PGA Tour in 2001, and finished in the top 100 in each of his first five seasons. His first professional tournament win came in 2005 at the PGA Tour's Chrysler Classic of Tucson. In February 2006 he beat Davis Love III in the final of the 2006 WGC-Accenture Match Play Championship.

Ogilvy won his first major championship at the 2006 U.S. Open, becoming the first Australian to win a men's golf major since Steve Elkington at the 1995 PGA Championship. Ogilvy finished his round with a champion's flourish, making improbable pars on each of the last two holes. He holed a 30-foot chip shot at the 17th, and then got up-and-down for par at the 18th, dropping a downhill six-footer for his final stroke as all his competitors collapsed around him. Phil Mickelson and Colin Montgomerie needed pars on the final hole to win, or bogeys to tie with Ogilvy, but they ruined their chances by producing double-bogey sixes to give Ogilvy a dramatic win. Jim Furyk needed par to force a playoff but bogeyed the final hole.

This success moved Ogilvy into the top ten of the Official World Golf Rankings for the first time, at Number 8. He reached his highest placing to date on 9 July 2006 when he was ranked Number 7, and he returned to that rank in February 2007 after finishing as runner-up to Henrik Stenson while defending his title at the 2007 WGC-Accenture Match Play Championship. He has spent over 120 weeks in the top-10 of the rankings.

Ogilvy won the 2008 WGC-CA Championship, his second World Golf Championship title, by one shot shooting 17-under par. It was his first PGA Tour win since the 2006 U.S. Open. In his next start at the 2008 Shell Houston Open he finished tied for 2nd moving him up to number 5 in the Official World Golf Rankings. In late June 2008, he rose to 3rd in the rankings. In 2009 Ogilvy continued his success at the WGC-Accenture Match Play Championship defeating Paul Casey. Ogilvy moved into second alone in World Golf Championship wins. This win brought him up to 4th in the Official World Golf Rankings.

In January 2010, Ogilvy won the SBS Championship, the opening event of the 2010 PGA Tour.

Ogilvy won the 2014 Barracuda Championship, a tournament that uses the modified Stableford scoring system, with a winning score of 49 points. It was his first victory in over 4 years.

Personal
Ogilvy and his wife Juli have three children.

Amateur wins
1995 Portsea Open Amateur
1996 German Amateur Open Championship
1997 Victorian Amateur Championship, Lake Macquarie Amateur

Professional wins (12)

PGA Tour wins (8)

PGA Tour playoff record (1–0)

European Tour wins (4)

PGA Tour of Australasia wins (2)

1Co-sanctioned by the OneAsia Tour

PGA Tour of Australasia playoff record (0–1)

Other wins (2)
1998 Tasmanian Open
2009 Telus World Skins Game

Major championships

Wins (1)

Results timeline

CUT = missed the half-way cut
"T" = tied

Summary

Most consecutive cuts made – 11 (2003 PGA – 2007 U.S. Open)
Longest streak of top-10s – 2 (2005 Open Championship – 2005 PGA)

Results in The Players Championship

CUT = missed the halfway cut
WD = withdrew
"T" indicates a tie for a place

World Golf Championships

Wins (3)

Results timeline
Results not in chronological order prior to 2015.

QF, R16, R32, R64 = Round in which player lost in match play
"T" = tied
Note that the HSBC Champions did not become a WGC event until 2009.

PGA Tour career summary

* Complete through the 2018 season.

Team appearances
Amateur
Nomura Cup (representing Australia): 1997
Bonallack Trophy (representing Asia/Pacific): 1998
Australian Men's Interstate Teams Matches (representing Victoria): 1995, 1996, 1997

Professional
Presidents Cup (International Team): 2007, 2009, 2011

See also

List of golfers with most PGA Tour wins
List of men's major championships winning golfers
2000 PGA Tour Qualifying School graduates

References

External links

 Geoff Ogilvy player profile, Golf Australia
 Geoff Ogilvy Foundation

Australian male golfers
PGA Tour of Australasia golfers
European Tour golfers
PGA Tour golfers
Winners of men's major golf championships
Sportspeople from Adelaide
Golfers from Scottsdale, Arizona
Golfers from San Diego
Australian people of English descent
Australian people of Scottish descent
1977 births
Living people